HMS Wilhelmina was a 32-gun fifth-rate frigate of the Royal Navy. She was previously a Dutch ship and had been built in 1787 for the Dutch Republic as the Wilhelmina. She was renamed Furie in 1795, after the establishment of the Batavian Republic as a client state of the First French Empire.  Like other Dutch ships at that time, she was pressed into service as part of French plans to support the Irish Rebellion of 1798 in the hope of destabilising Britain. The British captured her and the Dutch corvette Waakzaamheid in 1798 while the two were supporting French and Irish forces involved in the Irish Rebellion. The Royal Navy took both into service, with Furie regaining her original name. Sailing as HMS Wilhelmina, she spent the bulk of her later career in the East Indies, serving mostly as a troopship. Here she fought an unequal battle against a large French privateer, and succeeded in driving her off and protecting a merchant she was escorting. Wilhelmina was almost the ship that faced a superior French squadron at the Battle of Vizagapatam, but she was replaced beforehand by the larger . She spent the rest of her days as a guardship in Penang, and was sold there in 1813.

Dutch career and capture

Wilhelmina was built at Flushing in 1787, and armed with 32 guns. She sailed under that name for eight years for the Dutch Republic until the invasion of the Netherlands by the French in 1795 and the establishment of the Batavian Republic led to her being renamed Furie.

In 1798 she was part of the Dutch contribution hastily assembled to support the uprising of the United Irishmen in 1798. Furie, under the command of Captain Bartholomeus Pletz, and the 24-gun corvette Waakzaamheid under Captain Meindert van Neirop, were dispatched to carry men and supplies to Ireland. Furie embarked 165 troops and Waakzaamheid 122. In addition, the ships carried over 6,000 stands of arms and large quantities of other military stores with which to arm the Irish irregular forces that they expected to meet. There the British frigate , under the command of Captain Richard King, spotted them. Sirius had been stationed off the Texel to watch for Dutch movements and intercept any ships of smaller or equal size entering or leaving the waterway.

King first attacked the smaller and slower Waakzaamheid, avoiding contact with the larger Furie as he did so. At 09:00 Sirius came alongside Waakzaamheid and fired a gun at her, prompting van Neirop to surrender immediately. King secured Waakzaamheid and set off in pursuit of Furie, which was attempting to flee to the west. The chase lasted the rest of the day, with Sirius eventually coming within range at 17:00. The two ships exchanged broadsides for half an hour, as Pletz attempted to maneuver out of King's range. Furie was soon badly damaged whereas only one shot Dutch shot had struck Sirius, and that on the bowsprit. At approximately 17:30, Pletz surrendered, having lost eight dead and 14 wounded; Sirius had only one man wounded. King transferred the prisoners and placed a prize crew on Furie before returning to the Nore with his prizes.

British career
Furie came into Sheerness on 17 November 1798. She was commissioned as HMS Wilhelmina under Captain David Atkins in January 1800 and was then fitted as a troopship at Woolwich between January and September 1800 for the sum of £10,914. Captain Charles Herbert took command in April that year and Commander James Lind succeeded him in 1801.

Wilhelmina was among the vessels that served during the British campaign in Egypt between 8 March and 2 September. She carried troops for General Ralph Abercromby's landing at Abū Qīr, in the face of strenuous opposition, which is justly ranked among the most daring and brilliant exploits of the British army. Because Wilhelmina served in the navy's Egyptian campaign (8 March to 2 September 1801), her officers and crew qualified for the clasp "Egypt" to the Naval General Service Medal, which the Admiralty issued in 1847 to all surviving claimants.

Lind sailed Wilhelmina to the East Indies later that year. In 1802 she was in the Red Sea, supporting General Baird's expedition to Egypt to help General Ralph Abercromby expel the French there. On 14 June 1802 the transport Calcutta wrecked on the Egyptian coast in the Red Sea. She was carrying 331 men of the 80th Regiment of Foot and 79 native Indian followers.  arrived the next day, as did two transports. Only Romney was able to get her boats out but they were able to rescue and deliver to the shore all but seven men who had died in an early attempt to reach shore. Captain Sir Home Riggs Popham left  to salvage anything that could be salvaged and then sailed to Suez from whence he dispatched Wilhelmina to pick up the troops on the 15th and carry them back to India.

Lind remained with Wilhelmina until 1803. She then came under the temporary command of Lieutenant William Dobbie.

In May 1803 Commander Henry Lambert took command. In September Whilhelmina stopped briefly at Hambantota, Ceylon, where she dropped off an eight-man detachment from the Royal Artillery, who reinforced the British garrison there and later helped it repel a Kandian attack.

Battling the Psyche
On 9 April 1804 Wilhelmina was escorting the country ship William Petrie to Trincomalee when she sighted a strange sail. The unknown ship was the 36-gun French privateer Psyche, under the command of Captain Trogoff.

Psyche outgunned Wilhelmina, which was armed en flûte. Nevertheless, Lambert sailed towards Psyche to give William Petrie a chance to escape.

Light winds meant that the engagement did not begin until 11 April, when both ships opened fire, exchanging broadsides and attempting to tack around to rake their opponent. After several hours fighting, Psyche broke off and fled. Both ships had sustained heavy damage, Wilhelmina to her masts and rigging, while Psyche was in a near-sinking condition. Wilhelmina had nine of her crew wounded, three mortally and six slightly, while Psyche lost ten killed and 32 wounded, 13 of them mortally. Wilhelmina put into port, while William Petrie also arrived safely at her destination.

Almost a year later, on 14 February 1805, Lambert, now Captain (Acting) of  would meet Psyche, now a frigate of the French Navy, in battle off the Malabar Coast of India. Lambert was victorious in a sanguinary action that resulted in the British taking Psyche into service as HMS Psyche. In 1847 the Admiralty awarded the Naval General Service Medal with clasp "San Fiorenzo 14 Feby. 1805" to any still surviving claimants from the action.

Missed battle
In mid-1804 Wilhelmina was assigned to escort a small convoy of East Indiamen. Because a French squadron under Contre-Admiral Charles-Alexandre Durand Linois was raiding merchant shipping in the East Indies, the British commander in the area, Admiral Peter Rainier decided to replace Wilhelmina with the larger . Consequently, it was Centurion that resisted Linois's forces at the Battle of Vizagapatam in September 1804.

Fate
Captain Charles Foote took command of Wilhelmina in 1807, followed in an acting capacity by Commander William Hext in April 1809. She remained in the East Indies during this entire period. Commander Samuel Leslie took over in March 1811, followed in 1812 by Lieutenant George Norton. She became the guardship at Prince of Wales Island (Penang), and was sold there in January 1813.

Citations

References

 
 
 
 
 

Frigates of the Royal Navy
Frigates of the Royal Netherlands Navy
1787 ships
Ships built in Vlissingen